Empoasca is a genus of leafhoppers belonging to the family Cicadellidae subfamily Typhlocybinae.

Species
 Empoasca abrupta DeLong, 1931
 Empoasca affinis Nast, 1937
 Empoasca alsiosa Ribaut, 1933
 Empoasca apicalis (Flor, 1861)
 Empoasca canariensis Metcalf, 1955
 Empoasca decedens (Paoli, 1932)
 Empoasca decipiens Paoli, 1930
 Empoasca fabae Harris, 1841
 Empoasca irenae Anufriev, 1973
 Empoasca kontkaneni Ossiannilsson, 1949
 Empoasca ossiannilssoni Nuorteva, 1948
 Empoasca pteridis (Dahlbom, 1850)
 Empoasca punjabensis Singh-Pruthi, 1940
 Empoasca recurvata DeLong, 1931
 Empoasca serrata Vilbaste, 1965
 Empoasca solani (Curtis, 1846)
 Empoasca vitis (Göthe, 1875)

References

External links
 Fauna Europaea
 Biolib

Cicadellidae genera
Empoascini